Moora Neya, or the Message of the Spear is a 1911 Australian silent film which was the first Australian movie to emphasise aboriginal people.
 It was described by a contemporary newspaper report as "on the same lines as the Indian cowboy pictures with which the public are familiar, except that it is a colonial production, and blackfellows are substituted for Indians."

It is considered a lost film.

Plot
The plot consists of 41 scenes and appears to be an original written for the screen.

On a station west of the Darling River, Harry Earl is in love with the station owner's daughter. The evil manager makes advances on her but Earl beats him up. The overseer urges some local Aborigines to kill Earl but one of them, Budgerie, alerts the station men by writing a message on a spear.

The stockmen ride to the rescue and save Earl just as the Aborigines are about to perform a "Death Dance" around him. The overseer is killed and Earl is reunited with his love.

The main chapter headings were:
The attack on the Hut
Harry teaches the Overseer a lesson
A horrible revenge: the Overseer arranges with the aboriginals to kill Harry
To save her sweetheart
Arrival of the Police
Lovers re-united.

Cast
Ethel Phillips
Charles Villiers
Stanley Walpole

Production
The film was reportedly written by Rolfe's son, Syd. It was shot on location in Brewarrina on the Darling River and was one of the first Australian movies to depict Aboriginal people.

Star Charles Villiers later recalled:
We were anxious to get local color for an Australian picture, and it was decided to take the players and cameraman to Brewarrina, New South Wales, at which place there is a mission for blacks. On arrival an interview with the mission superintendent followed and it was agreed that we could have the services of the – blacks for picture purposes at an all-round rate of 2/ per day for each person. The offer, was submitted to the spokesman for the aborigines (union secretary, I suppose he really was), and after a 'wongi' with his men, it was accepted: So far so good. However, when the time came to drill the 'extras' into some sort of understanding of what they had to do, not a man of them would budge. Inquiries revealed the fact that we were up against a strike, and as we had travelled over 400 miles, at no little expense, negotiations had to be resumed. The terms were plain – 4/ a day and a stick of tobacco per man. This being the irreducible minimum we had to accept it, and lost- no time in getting through with the business.
Filming was completed by early July 1911.

Ethel Phillips later married her co-star Stanley Walpole.

Reception
One critic praised the movie saying "apart from its thrilling Incident, the film was particularly instructive to those without knowledge of the wild Australian aboriginal, as it showed them the grotesqueness of an indigenous blackfellow when in full warpaint."

The Advertiser called it:
highly exciting drama. The scenes are thoroughly Australian, and typical of the bush and backblock township life of Queensland, where the incidents of the drama were carried out. A strangely fantastic effect was obtained by the introduction of a tribe of genuine Australian alboriginals, whose grotesque war-painted bodies added to their weird corroborées. This is the first film introducing the Australian aboriginals in their native haunts, and war dances.
Charles Villiers later recalled:
When that film was screened in Sydney I met a movie fan who I knew very well. He had seen the picture; and I asked – him what he thought of it. 'Oh, not bad,' he replied, 'but the make-up of the Johnnies who did the niggers was not too good – it wouldn't deceive an Australian.' Subsequently we did another picture in which a few aborigines figured, and this time, we didn't bother about the real thing; Strange, to say, the movie fan was most enthusiastic over the counterfeit presentment, and remarked that it paid in picture work to stick to nature every- time. He seemed so happy that I had not the heart to undeceive him/

References

External links
 
Moora Neya at National Film and Sound Archive
Moora Neya at AustLit

Australian black-and-white films
Australian silent short films
Lost Australian films
Films directed by Alfred Rolfe
1911 films